The Basque Coast Open was a professional golf tournament that was played from 1967 to 1969 at Biarritz Golf Club in Biarritz, France. It was won by Spain's Manuel Ballesteros and France's Jean Garaïalde.

Winners

References 

Defunct golf tournaments in France
Sport in Biarritz
Recurring sporting events established in 1967
Recurring sporting events disestablished in 1969
1967 establishments in France
1969 disestablishments in France